Ram Prakash Chaudhary (born 7 January 1928 Adhoya in Ambala district (Haryana)) was member of 5th Lok Sabha from Ambala (Lok Sabha constituency) in Haryana State, India.

He was elected to 8th, 9th and 10th Lok Sabha from Ambala.

References

1928 births
People from Ambala district
India MPs 1971–1977
India MPs 1984–1989
India MPs 1989–1991
India MPs 1991–1996
Haryana politicians
Lok Sabha members from Haryana
Living people